Ruzhyn may refer to:

 Ruzhyn Raion, a raion (district) of Zhytomyr Oblast, Ukraine
 Ruzhyn (urban-type settlement), administrative district of Ruzhyn Raion
 Ruzhyn (village), Turiisk Raion, Volyn Oblast, Ukkraine
 Ruzhin (Hasidic dynasty)